The Dead Bird is a children's book by Margaret Wise Brown. Brown's text copyright was 1938 but it was not published until 1958 (by Addison-Wesley Publishing) with illustrations by Remy Charlip; this was after Brown's 1952 death. The story was reissued in 2016 with new illustrations by Christian Robinson. The book tells the story of a group of children who find a recently dead (still warm) bird, and bury it with ceremony. Always seen as a "gentle", "standout" book about the emotions attached to death, the book benefits in the newer version from Robinson's "cinematic storytelling", set in a "a lush urban park" with "characters [who] are diverse in gender and ethnicity but universal in their emotions, curiosity, and playfulness".

See also

Frog and the Birdsong
Duck, Death and the Tulip

References

1958 children's books
2016 children's books
American picture books
Books about birds
Books about death
Books by Margaret Wise Brown